Rajkamal is an Indian actor who has worked on Tamil films and television series. After making a breakthrough as an actor through television serials, he has worked on films including Sandikuthirai (2016) and Melnaattu Marumagan (2018).

Career
Rajkamal was introduced as an actor by director K. Balachander in the television series Sahana, which was a sequel to the director's successful 1985 drama film, Sindhu Bhairavi. He subsequently collaborated with the director for eleven further series produced by Kavithalayaa Productions in the 2000s. In 2006, Rajkamal participated in the inaugural series of Jodi Number One, a dance reality show by STAR Vijay, alongside his wife Latha Rao. He also then appeared alongside his wife in the "Aaja Meri Soniye" song in Venkat Prabhu's Saroja (2008). During 2007, Rajkamal won a Film Fans Association award, after being adjudged as having the best male performance in television serials during 2006.

In 2014, Rajkamal appeared in the role of a bank security officer in K. S. Ravikumar's Lingaa. He shot for the film in four days in Hyderabad alongside Rajinikanth and Anushka Shetty, after successfully passing a screen test. Rajkamal actively stalled his television career to seek out film opportunities after signing Melnaattu Marumagan in late 2015. His first theatrical release as the lead actor was however the romantic drama film Sandikuthirai (2016), where he featured opposite debutant Manasa. The film was based on the menace of technology and also doubled up as a murder mystery. In Melnaattu Marumagan (2018), Rajkamal portrayed the role of a tour guide in Mahabalipuram who has an ambition to marry a foreign woman. Paired opposite Andreanne Nouyrigat, the film was shot throughout 2015 and 2016.

Personal life
Rajkamal is married to fellow television actress, Latha Rao, and the pair have two daughters, Lara and Raga.

Filmography

Television
Serials

Shows

Films

References

Living people
Tamil male actors
Tamil male television actors
Television personalities from Tamil Nadu
Male actors from Tamil Nadu
Male actors in Tamil cinema
21st-century Tamil male actors